Hirudin (stylized as HiRUDiN) is the fourth studio album by Canadian electronic music band Austra, released on May 1, 2020, by Domino worldwide and by Pink Fizz Records in Canada.

Critical reception

Hirudin was met with generally favorable reviews from critics. At Metacritic, which assigns a weighted average rating out of 100 to reviews from mainstream publications, this release received an average score of 73, based on 11 reviews.

Track listing

References

2020 albums
Austra (band) albums
Domino Recording Company albums